Elbert Treadway (February 16, 1916 – August 1978) was an American Negro league pitcher in the 1930s.

A native of Geiger, Alabama, Treadway played for the Kansas City Monarchs in 1939. He died in Pineville, Louisiana in 1978 at age 62.

References

External links
 and Seamheads

1916 births
1978 deaths
Date of death missing
Kansas City Monarchs players
Baseball pitchers
Baseball players from Alabama
People from Sumter County, Alabama
20th-century African-American sportspeople